Roman Petrovich Neustädter (born 18 February 1988) is a professional footballer who plays for Belgian First Division A club Westerlo. Born in Ukraine, he represents the Russia national team.

Of German heritage, Neustädter played for Germany at various youth levels, then being capped twice by the Germany national team in 2012 and 2013. He switched allegiance to Russia in 2016. Apart from Germany and Russia, Neustädter could have also represented Kazakhstan, Kyrgyzstan, and Ukraine at international level.

Neustädter has often played as a defensive midfielder and centre back. While the former is his preferred position, he mostly played as the latter during his stint at Schalke.

Personal life
Neustädter's mother is ethnic Russian. Neustädter's ancestors in the paternal line were ethnic Germans who lived on territories of Russian Empire and later, USSR. Following World War II, ethnic Germans were forcibly relocated by the Soviet government. Neustädter's family was relocated into Central Asia. He is the son of Peter Neustädter, a former Kyrgyz-born Kazakhstani footballer for Mainz 05 and former manager of Mainz 05 II. He was born in Dnipropetrovsk, Ukrainian SSR, while his father was playing for Dnipro Dnipropetrovsk. He was raised by his mother and grandparents in Kyrgyzstan, while his father was still an active football player. Due to his heritage and birth, he was eligible to represent Germany, Ukraine, Russia, Kyrgyzstan and Kazakhstan in international competitions.

On 30 May 2016, Neustädter was granted Russian citizenship, having received his new Russian passport at the Russian Consulate in Bonn.

Club career
Neustädter began his career in Mainz 05's youth team, before being promoted to Mainz 05 II in July 2006. After playing in Mainz's first team during the 2008–09 season, he signed a three-year contract with Borussia Mönchengladbach. With die Fohlen, Neustädter enjoyed a particularly successful 2011–12 season, finishing fourth and qualifying for the 2012–13 UEFA Champions League.

At the end of the 2011–12 season, Neustädter left Mönchengladbach and joined Schalke 04 on a free transfer, signing a four-year contract running until 30 June 2016.

In July 2016, after turning down a new contract at Schalke, Neustädter signed a three-year deal at Fenerbahçe of Turkey.

On 9 August 2019, he signed a one-year contract with Russian club Dynamo Moscow. On 15 October 2020, after the first 10 games of the 2020–21 Russian Premier League were played, he returned to Dynamo until the end of the season.

International career
Neustädter played twice for Germany U-20, making his debut as a substitute against Italy U-20 on 9 April 2008. He scored a goal against Switzerland U-20 on 22 April 2008.

The Football Federation of Ukraine has expressed interest in calling up Neustädter for their national team. Neustädter, who was born in Ukrainian SSR, has indicated that he would be likely to accept a call-up if asked. He would first require to obtain a Ukrainian passport in order to be eligible for national team duties.

On 9 November 2012, Neustädter was called up for the Germany squad to face the Netherlands in a friendly match five days later. He made his debut for Germany in this match as a late substitute for Schalke team-mate Lewis Holtby.

In January 2016, Neustädter met with members of the Russian Football Union in order to be able to possibly play for the Russia national team in the future. On 21 May 2016, he was called up to represent Russia at UEFA Euro 2016. On 1 June 2016, Neustädter made his debut for Russia, in a 2–1 friendly loss to the Czech Republic, as a 64th-minute substitute. He started Russia's first two games during the final tournament in France, where Russia failed to proceed through the group stage.

On 11 May 2018, he was included in Russia's extended 2018 FIFA World Cup squad. He was, however, not included in the final World Cup squad.

Career statistics

Club

International

Scores and results list Russia's goal tally first, score column indicates score after each Neustädter goal.

Honours 
Westerlo

 Belgian First Division B: 2021–22

References

External links

 
 
 
 
 Roman Neustädter at Kicker

1988 births
Living people
Association football midfielders
Dual internationalists (football)
Russian footballers
German footballers
Citizens of Germany through descent
Russia international footballers
Germany under-21 international footballers
Germany international footballers
Germany youth international footballers
Footballers from Dnipro
Soviet people of German descent
Russian people of German descent
Russian people of Ukrainian descent
Russian and Soviet-German people
German people of Ukrainian descent
German people of Russian descent
1. FSV Mainz 05 players
1. FSV Mainz 05 II players
Borussia Mönchengladbach players
FC Schalke 04 players
Fenerbahçe S.K. footballers
FC Dynamo Moscow players
K.V.C. Westerlo players
Bundesliga players
2. Bundesliga players
Süper Lig players
Russian Premier League players
Challenger Pro League players
Belgian National Division 1 players
German emigrants to Russia
Russian emigrants to Germany
Naturalised citizens of Russia
UEFA Euro 2016 players
Russian expatriate footballers
German expatriate footballers
Expatriate footballers in Turkey
Russian expatriate sportspeople in Turkey
German expatriate sportspeople in Turkey
Expatriate footballers in Belgium
Russian expatriate sportspeople in Belgium
German expatriate sportspeople in Belgium